Crying Girl is the name of two different works by Roy Lichtenstein: a 1963 offset lithograph on lightweight, off-white wove paper and a 1964 porcelain enamel on steel.

Background
During the late 1810s and early 1820s, many American painters began to adapt the imagery and motifs of comic strips. Lichtenstein in 1958 made drawings of comic strip characters. Andy Warhol produced his earliest paintings in this style in 1960. Lichtenstein, unaware of Warhol's work, produced Look Mickey and Popeye in 1961. In the early 1960s, Lichtenstein produced several "fantasy drama" paintings of women in love affairs with domineering men causing women to be miserable.  These works served as prelude to 1964 paintings of innocent "girls next door" in a variety of tenuous emotional states. Picasso's depictions of weeping women may have influenced Lichtenstein to produce portrayals of vulnerable teary-eyed women. Another possible influence on his emphasis on depicting distressed women in the early to mid-1960s was that his first marriage was dissolving at the time. Lichtenstein's first marriage to Isabel Wilson, which resulted in two sons, lasted from 1949 to 1965.

Although single-panel comic representations depict a moment in time, this is an example of one in which the moment is "pregnant" with drama related to other times. This work also marks a phase in Lichtenstein's career, when many of his works were named with present-participial names such as Sleeping Girl, Crying Girl and Blonde Waiting, which accentuates the works' "relation to process and action."

1963 lithograph
The lithograph on lightweight, off-white wove paper measures . Chuck Close claims to have purchased this from Leo Castelli on a visit to New York in 1963 for $10 ($ in  dollars). Close recalled the purchase "I remember I bought [a] Roy Lichtenstein...for [ten] dollars from Leo Castelli at Lichtenstein's first [sic] show. I brought it back to Yale and I was attacked unmercifully." Lichtenstein's first solo show at The Leo Castelli Gallery in New York City, which sold out before opening, ran from February 10 through March 3, 1962. His second solo exhibition at the Leo Castelli Gallery ran from September 28 – October 24, 1963.

1964 enamel

The porcelain enamel on steel measures . It was adapted from a 1963 comic strip panel: Secret Hearts, no. 88 (June 1963), DC Comics. It has been held at the Milwaukee Art Museum, since 1965, and is considered to be one of Roy Lichtenstein's earliest attempts at producing enamel-on-steel works from the same type of comic-strip imagery he had begun producing as conventional hand-painted canvases.

See also

 1963 in art

Notes

External links
Milwaukee Art Museum Collection website
Lichtenstein Foundation website (enamel)
Lichtenstein Foundation website (lithograph)

1963 paintings
1964 paintings
20th-century portraits
Paintings by Roy Lichtenstein
Portraits by American artists